Established in 1945, Havana Cafe is a noted cafe situated in the al Bahsa Area in Damascus City, Syria. During the modern period the cafe became well known for its elite class of visitors, including politicians, high-ranking military officers, poets, artists, authors and journalists, in addition to a number of political refugees. The cafe is sometimes referred to as the birthplace of novels, poems, political conspiracies and even coups.

References 

Al Sharq Al Awsat Newspaper (Ar)

Buildings and structures in Damascus
1945 establishments in Mandatory Syria